Molac is a commune in the Morbihan department of Brittany in north-western France.

Geography

The river Arz forms most of the commune's south-western border, then flows eastward through the south-eastern part of the commune. Molac is located in the heart of a forest-covered region called in french the Landes de Lanvaux.

Map

Demographics
Inhabitants of Molac are called in French Molacais or Molacois.

See also
Communes of the Morbihan department

References

External links
 Mayors of Morbihan Association 

Communes of Morbihan